No. 231 Operational Conversion Unit was a Royal Air Force Operational conversion unit.

Operational history

 

231 OCU first formed in the aftermath of the Second World War during on 15 March 1947 at RAF Coningsby. Initially the OCU was formed from a nucleus provided by No. 16 OTU and was tasked with training crews of the "wooden wonder", the de Havilland Mosquito, in the light bomber and photo reconnaissance roles. Initial operational equipment was provided by Mosquito III and Mosquito B.XVI aircraft. In this role the unit lasted nearly three years before disbanding on 4 December 1949.

In keeping with its previous role when the OCU reformed on 1 December 1951 it was to train light bomber crews by redesignating 237 OCU. The aircraft used during the rest of the unit's operational service was the English Electric Canberra and most operational versions of that versatile aircraft were flown by the unit. It was reformed at RAF Bassingbourn and moved around various stations including RAF Bassingbourn, RAF Cottesmore and RAF Marham during its operational existence. It was redesignated the Canberra Standardisation Training Flight on 15 December 1990, but reverted to 231 OCU on 13 May 1991.

'D' Squadron was previously No. 204 Advanced Flying School at Bassingbourn which was disbanded on 13 February 1952. 204 AFS was previously No. 204 Crew Training Unit which was formed on 28 February 1947 at Cottesmore by redesignating an element of No. 16 OTU. 204 CTU was disbanded on 15 March 1947 at Cottesmore.

Disbandment
231 OCU was disbanded at RAF Wyton, Huntingdonshire on 23 April 1993, by which time it had trained for a variety of roles more than 8,000 aircrew from 17 different nations.

See also
 List of conversion units of the Royal Air Force

References

Citations

Bibliography

External links

 RAF Web

Military units and formations established in 1947
Conversion units of the Royal Air Force